Unsung Hero, also known as Uhero Magazine, was a music magazine publication based out of Gettysburg, Pennsylvania. It was an American magazine devoted to unsigned music and popular culture, centralized in the mid-Atlantic region of the United States.

The magazine focused on unsigned music artists and bands to spotlight, as well as other music-related articles.

History
Created by Suzanne and Greg Christianson of Gettysburg, Pennsylvania, out of a passion for great music that had yet to be discovered on a national level. This husband and wife team not only published a magazine together, but a supplemental website as well.

The magazine became a sponsor of Millennium Music Conference in 2000.

Style
As a smaller publication, Unsung Hero, followed in the vein of Rolling Stone and Spin magazines, focusing on music, fashion, and culture. It was often referred to as the "Bible of Local Music". Each month's magazine had a print run of approximately 50,000 copies, and was freely available.

Staff
While there were three people on the staff with the surname "Baker", none of the employees were related to each other. The Christianson's, however, were related: they were married to each other.

Editorial department
 Greg Christianson, Editor In Chief
 D.X. Ferris, Managing Editor

Art department
 Matt Crowner, Lead Artist
All artwork for the cover design, article spreads, and layout out of ad space was handled by Matt.

Public relations
 Kevin Baker, Director of Public Relations
Kevin, a member of Baltimore band, Live Alien Broadcast, handled the public image of the magazine as well as getting unsigned bands involved with the magazine.
 Andrea Baker, Merchandising Representative
Andrea joined the staff as the representative at shows sponsored by Unsung Hero to distribute magazines and merchandise. She was experienced with grassroots street-team management and band promotions, from her company Emerging Sounds.
 Lizzy.Dean Holyfield, Promotions Director
In addition to running promotions for the magazine, Lizzy.Dean also was a contributing writer giving his spin on the local scene. He also did a weekly segment on MHZ T.V. in DC. Lizzy.Dean also was a member of Baltimore band, Great Mutant Skywheel.
 Sheba Shough, Concert Series Management
Sheba was the magazine's primary Agent/Liaison for communication with/between musicians in the Mid-Atlantic Region.  Her primary roles included booking, promoting, and managing live events.  She managed live shows (i.e. PR, stage set-up, artist settlement), and acted as primary events planner for the Mid-Atlantic regional "Concert Series" that provided financial support to Unsung Hero Magazine.

Sales
 Suzanne Christianson, Main Sales
 Chris Keith, Director of Sales & Marketing
 Lori Bernish, Pittsburgh Area Ad Sales & Distribution
The sales staff would sell the ad space for venues, bands, artists, and other music related products to be advertised in the magazine. The distribution was nationwide in mostly music clubs, Hot Topic stores, and other trendy locations.

Contributing writers
 Mitch Kramer, cover article for Issue 31: Weapons for Peace

Features

 10 Minutes w/ Shana : Shana Baker
The main article or cover story of the artist or featured band was written by Shana. Shana would catch a show or performance and sit down with the subject(s) to obtain the story.

 The Noise : eEL
The Noise was a small and short section in the back of the magazine for CD and album reviews of music submitted by artists and bands to the magazine.

 UH.X : Donna Wise
The local radio station in Harrisburg, Pennsylvania (105.7 the X) would feature artists and bands that would be featured and reviewed in the magazine.

Venues

Several music clubs within the mid-atlantic collaborated with Unsung Hero magazine for artist showcases and magazine releases. Most notable were Fat Daddy's in York, PA; the Chameleon in Lancaster, PA; the Crowbar in PA; and the Recher Theater in Baltimore, MD.

As the magazine grew in success, it started the Uhero Concert Series. The following cities and clubs took part:
 Springfield, VA: Jaxx
 Philadelphia, PA: Grape Street Pub
 Baltimore, MD: 8x10
 Baltimore, MD: The Ottobar
 Reading, PA: Hiester's
 Pittsburgh: Club Laga
 Fairfax, VA: TT Reynolds
 Lancaster, PA: Blue Star Inn
 Washington DC: 9:30 Club
 New York City, NY: Downtime
 New York City, NY: The Continental

Magazine covers

2000
 January - Issue 7: Mary Prankster
 February - Issue 8:
 March - Issue 9: Darcie Miner
 April - Issue 10:
 May - Issue 11:
 June - Issue 12:
 July - Issue 13:
 August - Issue 14:
 September - Issue 15:
 October - Issue 16:
 November - Issue 17:
 December - Issue 18:

2001
 January - Issue 19: Project67
 February - Issue 20:
 March - Issue 21:
 April - Issue 22:
 May - Issue 23:
 June - Issue 24:
 July - Issue 25:
 August - Issue 26: Cactus Patch
 September - Issue 27: Fidel
 October - Issue 28: Buzz Poets
 November - Issue 29: Rezin
 December - Issue 30: Ivet

2002
 January - Issue 31: Gargantua Soul
 February - Issue 32: Weapons for Peace
 March - Issue 33: Margret Heater

References

Music magazines published in the United States
Defunct magazines published in the United States
Magazines with year of establishment missing
Magazines with year of disestablishment missing
Magazines published in Pennsylvania